John B. Rector (November 24, 1837 – April 9, 1898) was a United States district judge of the United States District Court for the Northern District of Texas.

Education and career

Born in Jackson County, Alabama, Rector graduated from Yale University in 1859 and read law to enter the bar in 1860. He entered private practice in Bastrop, Texas, interrupted by his service as a soldier in Terry's Texas Rangers during the American Civil War, beginning 1861. He was a district attorney of Travis County, Texas from 1866 to 1867, thereafter returning to private practice in Bastrop until 1871. He was a Judge of the 31st Judicial District of Texas from 1871 to 1876, when he again returned to private practice, in Austin, Texas.

Federal judicial service

On March 24, 1892, Rector was nominated by President Benjamin Harrison to a seat on the United States District Court for the Northern District of Texas vacated by Judge Andrew Phelps McCormick. Rector was confirmed by the United States Senate on March 28, 1892, and received his commission the same day. Rector served in that capacity until his death on April 9, 1898, in Dallas, Texas.

References

Sources
 

1837 births
1898 deaths
Judges of the United States District Court for the Northern District of Texas
United States federal judges appointed by Benjamin Harrison
19th-century American judges
19th-century American politicians
United States federal judges admitted to the practice of law by reading law
People from Jackson County, Alabama
People from Bastrop, Texas
People from Travis County, Texas